Veľké Kršteňany is a village and municipality in Partizánske District in the Trenčín Region of western Slovakia.

History
In historical records the village was first mentioned in 1271.
On May 13. 1908, Pavol Gašparovič Hlbina, a Slovak poet, priest and translator was born here.

Geography
The municipality lies at an altitude of 215 metres and covers an area of 13.476 km². It has a population of about 621 people.

References

External links

 
https://web.archive.org/web/20070513023228/http://www.statistics.sk/mosmis/eng/run.html

Villages and municipalities in Partizánske District